An ant mill is an observed phenomenon in which a group of army ants are separated from the main foraging party, lose the pheromone track and begin to follow one another, forming a continuously rotating circle, commonly known as a "death spiral" because the ants might eventually die of exhaustion. It has been reproduced in laboratories and has been produced in ant colony simulations. The phenomenon is a side effect of the self-organizing structure of ant colonies. Each ant follows the ant in front of it, which works until a slight deviation begins to occur, typically by an environmental trigger, and an ant mill forms. An ant mill was first described in 1921 by William Beebe, who observed a mill 1200 ft (~370 m) in circumference. It took each ant two and a half hours to make one revolution. Similar phenomena have been noted in processionary caterpillars and fish.

See also 
 Information cascade
 Feedback loop
 Stigmergy
 Woozle effect
 The blind leading the blind
 Rat king

References

External links 
YouTube video of an ant mill

Myrmecology
Ants
Insect behavior